Marthall is a civil parish in Cheshire East, England. It contains four buildings that are recorded in the National Heritage List for England as designated listed buildings, all of which are at Grade II. This grade is the lowest of the three gradings given to listed buildings and is applied to "buildings of national importance and special interest". Apart from the village of Marthall, the parish is rural. The listed buildings consist of three farmhouses and a milepost.

See also
 Listed buildings in Chelford
 Listed buildings in Great Warford
 Listed buildings in Knutsford

 Listed buildings in Mobberley
 Listed buildings in Nether Alderley
 Listed buildings in Peover Superior
 Listed buildings in Snelson

References

Citations

Sources

 

Listed buildings in the Borough of Cheshire East
Lists of listed buildings in Cheshire